The 2016 Tro-Bro Léon was the 33rd edition of the Tro-Bro Léon cycle race and was held on 17 April 2016. The race was won by Martin Mortensen.

General classification

References

2016
2016 in road cycling
2016 in French sport